Stephen Joseph McWhirter (b September 1964) is a Church of Ireland clergyman, the Incumbent at Kilmoremoy: he is also the  Archdeacon-designate of Killala and Achonry.

References

1964 births
People from Bangor, County Down
Living people
Archdeacons of Killala and Achonry
Alumni of the Church of Ireland Theological Institute
21st-century Irish Anglican priests